Dimitrios "Mitsos" Dimitriou (1948–2002) was a Greek football defender.

Career
Dimitriou played club football for Panathinaikos, appearing in 254 league matches in more than a decade with the club. He was runner up at 1971 European Cup Final but he didn't play due to injury. He played at 1971 Intercontinental Cup. Dimitriou won 4 Greek championships (1969, 1970, 1972, 1977) and 2 Greek cups (1969, 1977).

Dimitriou made his debut for the Greece national football team on 16 November 1969, and made 12 total appearances for Greece.

References

External links

pao.gr

1948 births
Greek footballers
Greece international footballers
Panathinaikos F.C. players
2002 deaths
Association football defenders
People from East Attica
Footballers from Attica